Xiangxi Airport is an airport under construction to serve Xiangxi Tujia and Miao Autonomous Prefecture in Hunan Province, China.  It is located in Huayuan County. The airport will be a dual-use general aviation and commercial aviation airport.

Construction of the airport started in 2020 with an investment of CNY 1.67 billion. The airport is expected to open for the first test flights in 2021.

See also
List of airports in China
List of the busiest airports in China
Zhangjiajie Hehua International Airport

References

Xiangxi Tujia and Miao Autonomous Prefecture
Airports in Hunan
Proposed airports in China